Jan Dembowski (Dębowski) (1770, Dębowa Góra – 1823) was a Polish general (promoted in 1812) and political activist.

Military career
In 1812 he was appointed to the Army of the Kingdom of Italy and commanded a brigade of, then on the staff of Pino's 15th Division of Eugène de Beauharnais's IV Corps in Russia. He led a brigade of Pino's Division at the Battle of Maloyaroslavets on 24 October.

Napoleon's defeat and Russian rule of Poland made it impossible for him to return there. 
Father of astronomer Ercole Dembowski, who lived out his life in Italy.

1770 births
1823 deaths
People from Kutno County
Clan of Jelita
Polish generals
Italian commanders of the Napoleonic Wars